Achyrocline mollis is a species of flowering plant in the Gnaphaliae tribe of the family Asteraceae. It is found only in Ecuador, Colombia and possibly Perú. Its natural habitat is subtropical or tropical moist montane forests. It is threatened by habitat loss.

References

mollis
Endemic flora of Ecuador
Critically endangered flora of South America
Taxonomy articles created by Polbot